IOAT may refer to:

 I/O Acceleration Technology
 Internet of Autonomous Things